Anthony Napunyi (born October 3, 1982) is a Kenyan professional boxer in the Featherweight division.

Pro career
On August 30, 2008, Napunyi beat the undefeated Hamis Ajali at the Charter Hall in Nairobi, Kenya.

In May 2009, Anthony lost to an undefeated Mikey Garcia, the bout was televised on TV Azteca.

References

External links

Featherweight boxers
1982 births
Living people
Kenyan male boxers